The 2007 Watsons Water Champions Challenge is a women's exhibition (no points for the world ranking can be earned) tennis tournament organized at the beginning of each season.

Players
Maria Sharapova (1)
Svetlana Kuznetsova (2), later replaced by Caroline Wozniacki
Kim Clijsters (3)
Elena Dementieva (4)
Patty Schnyder
Nicole Vaidišová
Yan Zi
Zheng Jie

Results

Golden Group (Main Draw)

Silver Group (Losers Bracket)

External links
Official website of this tournament  

Watsons Water Champions Challenge
Tennis tournaments in Hong Kong
2007 in Hong Kong sport
2007 in Chinese tennis
2007 in Hong Kong women's sport